Menesia longipes is a species of beetle in the family Cerambycidae. It was described by Stephan von Breuning in 1954. It is known from Borneo.

References

Menesia
Beetles described in 1954